Myagkov ( from мягкий meaning soft) is a Russian masculine surname, its feminine counterpart is Myagkova. It may refer to
Andrey Myagkov (1938–2021), Russian film and theater actor
Viktor Myagkov (born 1985), Russian football player

Russian-language surnames